This is a list of Alcorn State Braves football players in the NFL Draft.

Key

Selections

References

External links
College Football Database Warehouse: Alcorn State Historical Data 

Alcorn State

Alcorn State Braves NFL draft